, abbreviated as DOA (Dii ō ei), is a 1999 Japanese yakuza action film directed by Takashi Miike. It stars Riki Takeuchi as the gang boss and former yakuza Ryūichi and Show Aikawa as the Japanese cop Detective Jojima and focuses on their meeting and conflict. It is the first in a loosely-connected three-part series, followed by Dead or Alive 2: Birds in 2000 and Dead or Alive: Final in 2002.

Synopsis 
Ryūichi (Riki Takeuchi) is the leader of a small gang of nikkei gangsters operating in the Shinjuku ward of Tokyo, made up of his childhood friends, Satake (Hitoshi Ozawa), Mariko (Mizuho Koga), Hoshiyama (Ryuushi Muzkami) and Hitoshi (Kyousuke Yabe). They pull off a daring, broad daylight robbery of a truck carrying money out of a business run by Aoki (Renji Ishibashi), a local yakuza boss who is in the middle of negotiating a territory deal with a triad gang led by Mr. Chen (Shingo Tsurumi). Humiliated by the public loss of money at the hands of petty crooks, Aoki turns to Detective Jojima (Show Aikawa) of the Tokyo Metropolitan Police, instructing him to find the culprits of the robbery and turn them over to him. Jojima is heavily in debt to Aoki, since he and his wife (Kaoru Sugita) borrowed money to pay for a surgery that his daughter required to save her life.

Ryūichi and his cohorts pick up his younger brother, Toji (Michisuke Kashiwaya), from the airport. Toji had been studying in the United States and has temporarily returned home while on Spring Break. The gang parties to celebrate Toji's return but the mood is soured when Toji learns that Ryūichi has been paying for his studies by committing robberies for the yakuza. The mood is further soured when Ryūichi discovers that gang member Hitoshi has betrayed them and stolen a large part of the money from the heist. The gang tracks down Hitoshi to his mother's house and, despite Toji's pleas, Hitoshi is executed. After the murder, Toji doesn't want to see Ryūichi ever again.

Detective Jojima and his partner, Detective Inoue (Susumu Terajima), start investigating the robbery and discover leads that point to Ryūichi and his crew. They travel to Ryūichi's home town and find information on each of the gang's members. They also discover about Hitoshi's death. They bring Ryūichi in for questioning and try to talk him into confessing and going to prison, since he'll otherwise have to go up against the yakuza. Despite the threat, Ryūichi refuses to confess. In turn, Jojima tells Aoki that Ryūichi was behind the robbery.

In order to find out what Aoki is planning, Mariko spies on him while he visits the brothel where she works as her day job. Unfortunately for her, Aoki realizes who she is, drugs her, rapes her and then drowns her in a pool filled with feces. In retaliation, Ryūichi turns to the leader of one of Aoki's rival yakuza clans and offers to assassinate him in exchange for the guns to do so.

During a celebration of the new partnership between Aoki's yakuza and Chen's triad, Ryūichi, Satake and Hoshiyama make their move and attack all those gathered. Ryūichi is almost killed by Chen, but he is saved by Toji, who'd followed him to try to stop him from going forward with the hit. Detective Inoue arrives during the massacre, since he'd gotten a tip from an informant, and tries to arrest the nikkei gang. Inoue is shot and killed by Ryūichi, but not before he accidentally kills Toji. Distraught over his brother's death, Ryūichi flees in anguish, not realizing that Aoki has survived. Detective Jojima is the first officer on the scene after the battle is over, where he finds a dead Inoue and a cowering but still alive Aoki. After Aoki brags about how much money he'll make now that he doesn't have to share territory with the triads, Jojima kills him in disgust.

Jojima delivers the bad news to Inoue's wife and child, who decide to leave Tokyo in fear of further violence. Jojima decides to send his own wife and daughter away as well, giving them his car so they can go stay with his mother in the countryside. Unfortunately, Ryūichi had set up a bomb in that car to try to kill Jojima and it accidentally winds up killing his family instead.

After burying his wife and daughter, Jojima tracks down what remains of the nikkei gang as they prepare to leave the country for Taiwan. He runs their car off the road as they head towards the Tokyo docks and attacks them. Hoshiyama blows himself up with a grenade while trying to kill Jojima, but the detective survives and guns down Satake. Ryūichi and Jojima have a final stand-off where they both shoot each other repeatedly in the chest, but inexplicably neither one dies. Jojima draws a rocket launcher and Ryūichi produces a fireball from his hands and both attack each other with their new, supernatural weapons. The resulting explosion destroys the entirety of Japan.

Cast 
 Riki Takeuchi - Ryūichi
 Show Aikawa - Detective Jojima
 Renji Ishibashi - Aoki
 Susumu Terajima - Detective Inoue
 Hitoshi Ozawa - Satake
 Ryuushi Mizukami - Hoshiyama
 Shingo Tsurumi - Chen
 Michisuke Kashiwaya - Toji
 Mizuho Koga - Mariko
 Kyosuke Yabe - Hitoshi
 Kaoru Sugita - Mrs. Jojima
 Dankan - Tanaka
 Ren Osugi - Yan
 Hirotarō Honda - Detective Okuyama
 Tomorowo Taguchi - Afro Thug
 Hua Rong Weng - Immortal Chef
 Tokitoshi Shiota - Sakurai

Release
Dead or Alive was shown at the Tokyo International Film Festival in 1999. The film received a theatrical release in Japan on November 27 the same year.

Reception
A review in Sight & Sound found that the film "demonstrates enough flair and grotesque wit to make for very enjoyable viewing", with an ending that "demolishes any vestiges of genre credibility".

Aftermath and influence
The Dead or Alive films are not connected in any apparent way except by director Takashi Miike and stars Riki Takeuchi and Show Aikawa. In the first film, they play yakuza and cop, respectively. Dead or Alive is notable for Takashi Miike's characteristic scenes of ultra-violence and perversity, which come casually littered throughout.

See also
 List of action films of the 1990s
 List of Japanese films of 1999

References

References

External links 
 
 
 
  Dead or Alive at the Japanese Movie Database

1999 films
1999 action thriller films
1999 crime thriller films
1990s Japanese-language films
1990s psychological thriller films
Mandarin-language films
Yakuza films
Japanese action films
Films directed by Takashi Miike
Triad films
Films set in Tokyo
Dead or Alive (franchise) films
Daiei Film films
Kadokawa Dwango franchises
Discotek Media
1990s Japanese films
1990s Hong Kong films